The Order of Saint Lazarus of Jerusalem, also known as the Leper Brothers of Jerusalem or simply as Lazarists, was a Catholic military order founded by crusaders around 1119 at a leper hospital in Jerusalem, Kingdom of Jerusalem, whose care became its original purpose, named after its patron saint, Lazarus. It was recognised by King Fulk of Jerusalem in 1142 and canonically recognised as a hospitaller and military order of chivalry under the rule of Saint Augustine in the Papal bull Cum a Nobis Petitur of Pope Alexander IV in 1255. Although they were centred on their charism of caring for those afflicted with leprosy, the knights of the Order of Saint Lazarus notably fought in the Battle of La Forbie in 1244 and in the Defense of Acre in 1291. The titular seat was successively situated at Jerusalem, Saint-Jean-d'Acre and - after the fall of the Kingdom of Jerusalem - split in two main branches in Italy and in Château Royal de Boigny-sur-Bionne in France.

In 1489, Pope Innocent VIII attempted to merge the order and its land holdings with the Knights Hospitaller. This was resisted by the larger part of the jurisdictions of the Order of Saint Lazarus including those in France, Southern Italy, Hungary, Switzerland, and England. The Knights Hospitaller only managed to appropriate the Lazarus holdings in Germany.

In 1572, the Order of Saint Lazarus in Italy was merged with the Order of Saint Maurice under the Royal House of Savoy to form the Order of Saints Maurice and Lazarus, which still exists until today, widely recognised as a dynastic successor of the Italian branch. This merger however excluded the holding in the southern part of Italy, then forming part of the Spanish realm. These were transformed into ecclesiastical benefices. The Duke of Savoy only managed to gain control of those benefices sited in the duchy of Savoy.

In 1608, King Henry IV of France, with the approval of the Holy See, linked the French section administratively to the Order of Our Lady of Mount Carmel to form the Royal Military and Hospitaller Order of Our Lady of Mount Carmel and Saint Lazarus of Jerusalem united. This branch became closely linked to the Royal Crown during the 18th century with the serving grand masters then being members of the Royal family. It suffered the consequences of the French Revolution, and went into exile along with its grand master Louis-Stanislas-Xavier, Comte (count) de Provence, king-in-exile Louis XVIII. It formally lost its royal protection in 1830 and then ceased to remain listed as of royal protection in the French Royal Almanac.

The word lazarette, in some languages being synonymous with leprosarum, is believed to also be derived from the hospitaller Order of Saint Lazarus, these edifices being adopted into quarantine stations in the fifteenth century when leprosy was no longer the scourge it had been in earlier centuries.

History

Crusades
The military order of Saint Lazarus of Jerusalem originated in a leper hospital founded in the twelfth century by crusaders of the Latin Kingdom. There had been earlier leper hospitals in the East, of which the Knights of St. Lazarus claimed to be the continuation, in order to have the appearance of remote antiquity and to pass as the oldest of all orders. According to Charles Moeller, "this pretension is apocryphal"; but documentary evidence does confirm that the edifice was a functioning concern in 1073.

The Order of St. Lazarus was purely an order of hospitallers in the beginning, and adopted the hospital Rule of St. Augustine in use in the West. It has been claimed that the Order assumed a military role in the 12th century, but this not supported by verifiable evidence. The Lazarists wore a green cross upon their mantle.

Hospitals dependent on the Jerusalem leprosarium were eventually established in other towns in the Holy Land, notably in Acre, and in various countries in Europe particularly in Southern Italy (Capua), Hungary, Switzerland, France (Boigny), and England (Burton Lazars). Louis VII of France, on his return from the Second Crusade, gave it the Château of Broigny, near Orléans in 1154. This example was followed by Henry II of England, and by Emperor Frederick II.

In 1154, King Louis VII of France gave the Order of Saint Lazarus a property at Boigny near Orléans which was to become the headquarters of the order outside of the Holy Land. Later, after the fall of Acre in 1291 the Knights of St. Lazarus left the Holy Land and moved first to Cyprus, then Sicily and finally back to Boigny, which had been raised to a barony in 1288.

The Order remained primarily a hospitaller order. They did take part in a number of battles, but there is no evidence for this prior to the fall of Jerusalem (1244). After the fall of Jerusalem in July 1244 and the subsequent Battle of La Forbie the following October, the Order of St. Lazarus, although still called "of Jerusalem", transferred to Acre, where it had been ceded territory by the Templars in 1240. The Ordinis Fratrum & Militum Hospitalis Leprosorum S. Lazari Hierosolymitani under Augustinian Rule was confirmed by Papal Bull Cum a Nobis Petitur of Pope Alexander IV in April 1255. In 1262 Pope Urban IV assured it the same immunities as were granted to the monastic orders.

Late medieval period
The order quickly abandoned its military activities after the fall of Acre in 1291. As a result of that catastrophe, the leper hospital of St. Lazarus of Jerusalem disappeared, but its commanderies in Europe, together with their revenues, continued. In 1308, King Philip IV of France gave the order his temporal protection.

In 1490, Pope Innocent VIII attempted to amalgamate the order with the Knights of St. John, including the handing-over to the Knights of the possessions of the Order. Although that was confirmed in 1505 by Pope Julius II, the Order of Saint Lazarus resisted the move, and the order of St. John never came into possession of the property, except in Germany. In France, the bull of suppression was ignored and French Grand Masters appointed. The order of Saint John pursued its claim to the French holdings but that was legally rejected by the Parliament of Paris in 1547.

In 1565, Pope Pius IV annulled the bulls of his predecessors and restored all possessions to the order so that he might give the grand magistry to a favorite, Giovanni de Castiglione. However, de Castiglione did not succeed in securing the devolution of the commanderies in France. By the end of the 16th century, the Order retained a significant presence only in France and Italy.

Continuations after 1572

Royal House of Savoy

With the death of the papal favorite, Castiglione, in 1572, the grand magistry of the order was rendered vacant and Pope Gregory XIII united the Italian branch with the Order of Saint Maurice to set up the Order of Saints Maurice and Lazarus. This order was then linked in perpetuity with the Crown of Savoy and thenceforth the title of its Grand Master was hereditary in that house. 
 
By the time of Pope Clement VIII the order had two houses, one at Turin, was to contribute to combats on land, while the other, at Nice, had to provide galleys to fight the Turks at sea. But when thus reduced to the states of the Duke of Savoy, the order merely vegetated until the French Revolution, which suppressed it. In 1816 the King of Sardinia, Victor Emmanuel I, re-established the titles of Knight and Commander of Sts. Maurice and Lazarus, as simple decorations, accessible without conditions of birth to both civilians and military men.

This became a national order of chivalry on the unification of Italy in 1861, but has been suppressed by law since the foundation of the Republic in 1946. Since 1951 the order has not been recognized officially by the Italian state. However, the House of Savoy in exile continued to bestow the order. Today, it is granted to persons eminent in the public service, science, art, letters, trade, and charitable works.

Royal House of France

In 1604, Henry IV of France re-declared the French branch of the order a protectorate of the French Crown. King Henry IV founded in 1608, with the approbation of Pope Paul V, the Order of Notre-Dame du Mont-Carmel. He then, in turn, united to this new order the possessions of St. Lazarus in France, and such is the origin of the title Ordres Royaux, Militaires & Hospitaliers de Saint Lazare de Jérusalem & de Notre-Dame du Mont-Carmel réunis ("Royal, Military, and Hospitaller Orders of Our Lady of Mount Carmel and St. Lazarus of Jerusalem united"). This amalgamation eventually received formal canonical acceptance on 5 June 1668 by a bull issued by Cardinal Legate de Vendôme under Papal authority of Clement IX.

Unlike the situation with the Savoyian Order of Saints Maurice and Lazarus where a complete merger took place creating one order, the French branch was not completely merged with the Order of Our Lady of Mount Carmel, and the orders were managed as two separate entities, with individuals being admitted to one order but not necessarily to both.

During the French Revolution, a decree of 30 July 1791 suppressed all royal and knightly orders in France. Another decree the following year confiscated all the Order's properties. The Holy See, which had originally created the Order, on the other hand did not suppress the order; while Louis, Count of Provence, then Grand Master of the order, who later became Louis XVIII, continued to function in exile and continued admitting various dignitaries to the order.

Scholars differ in their views regarding the extent to which the Order remained active during and after the French Revolution. There is however no doubt of its continuing existence during this time. In different museums, there are preserved a number of paintings of Russian and Baltic nobles, admitted to the order after 1791. In this list are general John Lamb, Prince Suvorov, count Pahlen, count Sievers etc. Some of the new knights are listed in Almanach Royal from 1814 to 1830. King Louis XVIII, the order's protector, and the duc de Châtre, the order's lieutenant-general, both died in 1824. In 1830, a royal decree caused the order to lose its royal protection in France.

Gallery

See also

 Grand Masters of the Order of Saint Lazarus
List of Delegations and Commanderies in North America

Successors
 Order of Saints Maurice and Lazarus
 Royal Military and Hospitaller Order of Our Lady of Mount Carmel and Saint Lazarus of Jerusalem united

In popular culture
 The Order of Saint Lazarus is depicted in season two of the television series Knightfall.
 A fictionalized version of the Order is depicted in the television series A Discovery of Witches.

References

Bibliography
 
 
 
 Environ (1295), Constitution, règlements et nécrologie de Seedorf (Suisse).

Further reading
 
 
 
Military History Online - Order of St.Lazarus in the Latin East

External links

 Wikisource: "Order of St Lazarus of Jerusalem". Catholic Encyclopaedia (1913)

 
1098 establishments in Asia
History of Catholicism in France